

See also 2009 in birding and ornithology, main events of 2010 and 2011 in birding and ornithology
The year 2010 in birding and ornithology.

Worldwide

New species
See also Bird species new to science described in the 2000s

 Limestone leaf warbler, Phylloscopus calciatilis: 
 Fenwick's antpitta or Urrao antpitta, Grallaria fenwickorum: 
 Socotra buzzard, Buteo socotraensis: 
 Willard's sooty boubou, Laniarius willardi: 
 Rock tapaculo, Scytalopus petrophilus:

Taxonomic developments

Ornithologists

Deaths

World listing

Europe

Britain

Breeding birds
Purple heron (Ardea purpurea) successfully bred in the UK for the first time on the Dungeness peninsula in Kent.

Migrant and wintering birds

Rare birds

Other Events

Rare birds

North America
To be completed

References

Birding and ornithology
Bird
Birding and ornithology by year